Marihan is a constituency of the Uttar Pradesh Legislative Assembly covering the city of Marihan in the Mirzapur district of Uttar Pradesh, India.

Marihan is one of five assembly constituencies in the Mirzapur Lok Sabha constituency. Since 2008, this assembly constituency is numbered 399 amongst 403 constituencies.

Election results

2022

2017
Bharatiya Janta Party candidate Rama Shankar Singh won in 2017 Uttar Pradesh Legislative Elections defeating Indian National Congress candidate Lalitesh Pati Tripathi by a margin of 46,598 votes.

References

External links
 

Assembly constituencies of Uttar Pradesh
Mirzapur district